Grzegórzki is one of 18 districts of Kraków, located in the central part of the city. The name Grzegórzki comes from a village of same name that is now a part of the district. 

Subdivisions of Grzegórzki 
Grzegórzki is divided into smaller subdivisions (osiedla). Here's a list of them.
 Dąbie
 Olsza
 Wesoła
 Grzegórzki
 Osiedle Oficerskie

Population

References

External links
 Official website of Grzegórzki
 Biuletyn Informacji Publicznej 

Districts of Kraków